Rapide-Danseur is a municipality in northwestern Quebec, Canada, in the Abitibi-Ouest Regional County Municipality. It covers 173.73 km2 and had a population of 380 as of the Canada 2021 Census.

The municipality was incorporated on January 1, 1981.

Demographics

Private dwellings occupied by usual residents: 161 (total dwellings: 209)

Mother tongue:
 English as first language: 1.3%
 French as first language: 98.7%
 English and French as first language: 0%
 Other as first language: 0%

Municipal council
The municipal council consists of:
 Mayor: Alain Gagnon
 Councillors: Joannie Langlois, Lorraine Doucet-Dion, Line Giasson, François Cloutier, Christiane Guillemette, Annie Gauthier

Political representation 

Provincially it is part of the riding of Abitibi-Ouest. In the 2022 Quebec general election the incumbent MNA Suzanne Blais, of the Coalition Avenir Québec, was re-elected to represent the population of Rapide-Danseur in the National Assembly of Quebec.

Federally, Rapide-Danseur is part of the federal riding of Abitibi—Témiscamingue. In the 2021 Canadian federal election, the incumbent Sébastien Lemire of the Bloc Québécois was re-elected to represent the population Rapide-Danseur in the House of Commons of Canada.

References

Municipalities in Quebec
Incorporated places in Abitibi-Témiscamingue
Populated places established in 1928